H.E Dr. Rashid Al Leem (Arabic: راشد الليم; born Rashid Obaid Jumaa Al Leem) is the former chairman of Sharjah Electricity and Water Authority (SEWA). The ruler of Sharjah, His Highness Dr. Sheikh Sultan bin Mohammed Al Qassimi chose him at the young age to the project of building and economic zone in the emirate. He has also written several books. The Vice-President and Prime Minister of the UAE and Ruler of Dubai Sheikh Mohammed Bin Rashid Al Maktoum, honoured him the title Ambassador of Knowledge of the UAE.

He has received several international honours and awards in different fields. He also received an award of  Middle East Business Leaders Award 2012 by the President of Indonesia.

Personal life

He was born on 1 December 1966 to a middle-class family. In 1983, he went to abroad for the higher education. He completed professional education in abroad. After finishing his study, he joined Amoco Oil in 1989. 
In 1989, he received the diploma in petroleum engineering from Azusa Pacific University, Los Angeles. In 2004, he obtained MBA from Atlantic University, Florida and in 2012, he also received PhD degree in management from University of Salford, UK.

He has also published several books, including My Leadership Secrets and My Green Journey in Hamriyah that details his experience in the free trade zone. He has also written several books about his transnational measures in Sharjah Electricity and Water Authority in his capacity as the Chairman, the most popular one being The SEWA Way.   The Vice-President and Prime Minister of the UAE and Ruler of Dubai Sheikh Mohammed Bin Rashid Al Maktoum, honoured him the title Ambassador of Knowledge of the UAE.

Career
He worked in different companies and institutions as; 
In 2000, Director-general of Hamriyah Free Zone Authority. In 2007,  Achievement Award by League of Arab States. In 2011,  Excellence in Leadership award from the Federation of Indian Chambers of Commerce & Industry. In 2012, Middle East Business Leaders Award from the President of Indonesia.
In 2014, he was appointed as the Chairman of Sharjah Electricity and Water Authority.

Awards and honours
 Middle East Business Leaders Award 2012 by the President of Indonesia.
 The honour of Environmentalist of the Year 2012 by Mahathir Mohamad, Malaysian prime minister.
  The Achievement Award by League of Arab States.
 Gold Medal from the Mayor of Cannes.
 Excellence in Leadership award from Federation of Chamber of Commerce & Industry in India. 
  Man of the Year by Khaleej Times newspaper.  Maritime Personality for 2009 by Marine Business TV. Ambassador of Knowledge of the UAE'' by the Ruler of Dubai.

Rashid Alleem Premier League (RPL) 
RPL is a corporate cricket tournament started by H.E Dr. Rashid Alleem in 2016 as an initiative to promote Good Health and Well Being, one of the 21 Alleem sustainable development goals. RPL is a Twenty20 cricket tournament played on grass ground and turf pitch with cork ball. Now the tournament just completed its 5th Season in 2020 with 72 corporate cricket teams making it the biggest corporate cricket tournament in GCC. Gulf International won the Season 5, 2020 championship title

RPL matches are live streamed on YouTube and scoring is done online using crichHQ (2017-2018) and Cricheroes (2018-current).

See also 
 Hamriyah Free Zone
 Sharjah Electricity and Water Authority
 Emirate of Sharjah
 Dubai Electricity and Water Authority
 Rashid Alleem Premier League

References

External links
 Dr. Rashid AL Leem attends formal inauguration of twin trade events at Muscat
 Al Leem: Hamriyah's Man With A Vision

1966 births
Living people
Alumni of the University of Salford
People from the Emirate of Sharjah